United Nations Security Council resolution 1490, adopted unanimously on 3 July 2003, after resolutions 687 (1991), 689 (1991), 806 (1993), 833 (1993) and 1483 (2003) on the situation between Iraq and Kuwait, the Council extended the mandate of the United Nations Iraq–Kuwait Observation Mission (UNIKOM) monitoring the mutual border for a final period until 6 October 2003.

The Security Council reaffirmed the commitment of all states to the sovereignty and territorial integrity of both Iraq and Kuwait. It recognised that the UNIKOM operation and demilitarised zone established in 1991 between the two states was no longer necessary to protect Kuwait from Iraqi actions.

Acting under Chapter VII of the United Nations Charter, the resolution extended UNIKOM's mandate for a final time and ended the demilitarised zone between the two countries. It instructed the Secretary-General Kofi Annan to negotiate the transfer of UNIKOM's non-removable property and assets that could not be disposed otherwise to Iraq and Kuwait.

See also
 Gulf War
 Invasion of Kuwait
 Kuwait–Iraq barrier
 List of United Nations Security Council Resolutions 1401 to 1500 (2002–2003)
 Iraq War

References

External links
 
Text of the Resolution at undocs.org

 1490
2003 in Iraq
2003 in Kuwait
 1490
 1490
July 2003 events